Rear Admiral Alfred Charles Ransom CBE (1871–1953) was a senior Royal Navy officer.

Naval career
Born on 22 August 1871, Alfred Ransom was educated at Bedford Modern School (1878–84), and Bedford School. He received his first commission in the Royal Navy in 1888 and served during the anti-slavery Gambia Expedition, in 1894. He served in China during the Boxer Rebellion, between 1900 and 1901, and during the First World War, serving aboard  between 1914 and 1916. He attained the rank of paymaster rear admiral and retired from the Royal Navy in 1926.

Rear Admiral Alfred Ransom was invested as a Commander of the Order of the British Empire in 1925. He died in Torquay on 28 June 1953.

References

1871 births
1953 deaths
People educated at Bedford Modern School
People educated at Bedford School
Royal Navy admirals
Royal Navy personnel of World War I
Commanders of the Order of the British Empire
Royal Navy logistics officers